Manuel Ciavatta (born 27 December 1976) is a Sammarinese politician who is one of two Captains Regent (heads of government for San Marino) in office since 1 October 2022. He is serving alongside Maria Luisa Berti.

Biography 
Ciavatta was born in City of San Marino and has a degree in civil engineering from the University of Bologna, but also a bachelor's degree in Sacred Theology.

He is a member of the Sammarinese Christian Democratic Party, where he serves as deputy political secretary. He served in the XXVIII legislature of the Grand and General Council from 2012 to 2016 and again in the XXX legislature since 2019. He is passionate about teaching and education and serves as a professor of physics and technology at the Center for Professional Training and Technical Education at the Fonte dell’Ovo Middle School.

On 16 September 2022 the Grand and General Council elected him and Maria Luisa Berti as Captains Regent of San Marino to serve from 1 October 2022 to 1 April 2023.

References 

1976 births
Living people
Captains Regent of San Marino
Members of the Grand and General Council
Sammarinese Christian Democratic Party politicians
Sammarinese educators
University of Bologna alumni
People from the City of San Marino